Bryce Thomas Scouller, known by his sporting name Thomas Hyslop (20 August 1871 – 21 April 1936) was a Scottish footballer who played in the Football League for Stoke City and Sunderland He also played for Sunderland and Rangers.

He represented the Scotland national team, playing twice against England in 1896 and in 1897, scoring on his debut. He was one of a group of five men who were the first to be selected while playing for an English club, and also the first Stoke player to be capped by Scotland.

Career
Hyslop was born as Bryce Scouller in Ayrshire but grew up in Elderslie, Renfrewshire; he began his career with Elderslie and also played football whilst serving with the Royal Scots. He moved to England and joined Millwall Athletic (using the pseudonym Tommy Hyslop – his middle name and his mother's maiden name– to escape his military connections) before joining Football League side Sunderland in 1893. He spent one season at Sunderland and joined a struggling Stoke side in March 1894.

Hyslop, as he was now known in football circles, made an instant impact at Stoke scoring seven goals in the final six matches of the 1894–95 season to move Stoke away from the foot of the table. In 1895–96 he finished top scorer with 21 goals to his name and at the end of the campaign he returned to Scotland with Rangers, where he won the Glasgow Merchants Charity Cup, Scottish Cup and Glasgow Cup in 1896–97 and retained the latter two trophies the following season.

He made a short unsuccessful return to Stoke in 1898 before continuing his career in Scotland. He later moved to Canada, where he used his birth name but supplied a false age enabling him to enlist in the Canadian Expeditionary Force during World War I, and also played football in the United States before returning to Scotland. He died in Paisley in 1936.

Career statistics

Club
Source:

International
Source:

International goals
Scores and results list Scotland's goal tally first.

References

External links
 
 International stats at Londonhearts.com

Scottish footballers
Stoke City F.C. players
Sunderland A.F.C. players
Rangers F.C. players
English Football League players
Scottish Football League players
1871 births
1936 deaths
Scotland international footballers
Johnstone F.C. players
Partick Thistle F.C. players
Footballers from East Ayrshire
Footballers from Renfrewshire
Millwall F.C. players
Canadian Army soldiers
Scottish military personnel
Canadian military personnel of World War I
Canadian Expeditionary Force soldiers
Scottish expatriate sportspeople in Canada
Royal Scots soldiers
British military personnel of the Second Boer War
Abercorn F.C. players
Dundee Wanderers F.C. players
Association football forwards